Airton Andrioli (born 22 February 1965) is a Brazilian professional football player and coach. He is currently the head of youth football and assistant coach for A-League club Adelaide United.

Career
He played for West Adelaide in the Australian National Soccer League.

Until June 2004 he coached the women team of the Canberra United FC. Since August 2005 until February 2010 he was a head coach of the Solomon Islands national football team. Since February 2010 he worked as FFSA Technical Director. Since 2013 he coached the Australia national beach soccer team.

After the appointment of Carl Veart as Adelaide United's new interim head coach, Andrioli was appointed as his assistant for the remainder of the 2019–20 A-League season after it was resumed following the COVID-19 pandemic in Australia. On 13 November 2020, the club announced that Andrioli would remain as Veart's assistant going into the 2020–21 A-League season and was also announced as the club's Head of Youth Football.

References

External links

Profile at Soccerpunter.com

Ayrton Andrioli at Aussie Footballers

1965 births
Living people
Brazilian footballers
West Adelaide SC players
Association football midfielders
Brazilian football managers
Expatriate football managers in the Solomon Islands
Solomon Islands national football team managers
Place of birth missing (living people)
National Soccer League (Australia) players